Andy Murray defeated Milos Raonic in the final, 6–4, 7–6(7–3), 7–6(7–2), to win the gentlemen's singles tennis title at the 2016 Wimbledon Championships. It was his second Wimbledon title and third major title overall.

Novak Djokovic was the two-time defending champion, but lost in the third round to Sam Querrey. This was Djokovic's first defeat before the quarterfinals of a major since the 2009 French Open. The defeat also ended his streak of four consecutive major victories, dating back to the 2015 Wimbledon Championships.
	
Raonic defeated Roger Federer in the semifinal to become the first Canadian man to reach a major singles final. He was also the first non-European to reach the Wimbledon final since Andy Roddick in 2009, the first player born in the 1990s to reach a major final, and the first non-European to make any major final since Kei Nishikori at the 2014 US Open. Querrey became the first American man to reach the quarterfinals at a singles major since John Isner and Andy Roddick at the 2011 US Open.

Federer did not play tennis for the rest of the season due to knee and back injuries.

Seeds 
All seedings per modified ATP rankings.

  Novak Djokovic (third round)
  Andy Murray (champion)
  Roger Federer (semifinals)
  Stan Wawrinka (second round)
   Kei Nishikori (fourth round, retired due to a rib injury)
  Milos Raonic (final)
  Richard Gasquet (fourth round, retired due to a back injury)
  Dominic Thiem (second round)
  Marin Čilić (quarterfinals)
  Tomáš Berdych (semifinals)
  David Goffin (fourth round)
  Jo-Wilfried Tsonga (quarterfinals)
  David Ferrer (second round)
  Roberto Bautista Agut (third round)
  Nick Kyrgios (fourth round)
  Gilles Simon (second round)

  Gaël Monfils (first round)
  John Isner (third round)
  Bernard Tomic (fourth round)
  Kevin Anderson (first round)
  Philipp Kohlschreiber (first round)
  Feliciano López (third round)
  Ivo Karlović (second round)
  Alexander Zverev (third round)
  Viktor Troicki (second round)
  Benoît Paire (second round)
  Jack Sock (third round)
  Sam Querrey (quarterfinals)
  Pablo Cuevas (first round)
  Alexandr Dolgopolov (second round)
  João Sousa (third round)
  Lucas Pouille (quarterfinals)

Qualifying

Draw

Finals

Top half

Section 1

Section 2

Section 3

Section 4

Bottom half

Section 5

Section 6

Section 7

Section 8

References

 Men's Singles Draw
 2016 Wimbledon Championships – Men's draws and results at the International Tennis Federation

Men's Singles
Wimbledon Championship by year – Men's singles